Dmytro Zhdanov (born 16 July 1996) is a Ukrainian professional footballer who plays as a midfielder for Club Green Streets.

Career
He made his debut for Stal Alchevsk in the Ukrainian First League in 2014. Then in February 2015 Zhdanov signed a contract with FC Zorya.

He played for Zorya Luhansk in the Ukrainian Premier League.

In January 2017 he signed a contract with Maldivian football Club Green Streets, along with another two Ukrainian footballers. He made his debut for CGS in a match against Victory Sports Club on 25 February 2017.

References

External links 

1996 births
Living people
Ukrainian footballers
FC Stal Alchevsk players
FC Stal-2 Alchevsk players
FC Zorya Luhansk players
FC Kramatorsk players
Club Green Streets players
FC Lyubomyr Stavyshche players
Ukrainian First League players
Ukrainian Second League players
Association football midfielders
Ukrainian expatriate footballers
Expatriate footballers in the Maldives
Ukrainian expatriate sportspeople in the Maldives